Reuben Recaldo Appleton is an Antiguan Olympic middle-distance runner. He represented his country in the men's 1500 meters at the 1996 Summer Olympics. His time was a 4:02.99.

References

1968 births
Living people
Antigua and Barbuda male middle-distance runners
Olympic athletes of Antigua and Barbuda
Athletes (track and field) at the 1992 Summer Olympics